Antônio Tenório da Silva (born 24 October 1970) is a Brazilian judoka. As a child, he lost the vision in his left eye from an accident while playing with a slingshot. Six years later, an infection claimed the vision in his right eye, leaving him completely blind at the age of 19.

He has participated in six Summer Paralympics and has won 4 golds,1 silver and a 1 bronze. With his win at the 2008 Games, he became the first person to win four consecutive Paralympic gold medals in judo.

References

1970 births
Living people
Paralympic judoka of Brazil
Judoka at the 1996 Summer Paralympics
Judoka at the 2000 Summer Paralympics
Judoka at the 2004 Summer Paralympics
Judoka at the 2008 Summer Paralympics
Judoka at the 2012 Summer Paralympics
Judoka at the 2016 Summer Paralympics
Paralympic gold medalists for Brazil
Paralympic bronze medalists for Brazil
Sportspeople with a vision impairment
Medalists at the 1996 Summer Paralympics
Medalists at the 2000 Summer Paralympics
Medalists at the 2004 Summer Paralympics
Medalists at the 2008 Summer Paralympics
Medalists at the 2012 Summer Paralympics
Medalists at the 2016 Summer Paralympics
Brazilian male judoka
Paralympic medalists in judo
Medalists at the 2011 Parapan American Games
21st-century Brazilian people
20th-century Brazilian people